General elections were held in Republika Srpska on 3 October 2010, as part of the general elections across Bosnia and Herzegovina. The presidential elections were won by Milorad Dodik of the Alliance of Independent Social Democrats.

Results

President

National Assembly

References

Republika Srpska
Elections in Republika Srpska
2010 in Bosnia and Herzegovina
Election and referendum articles with incomplete results